Murexsul queenslandicus is a species of sea snail, a marine gastropod mollusk in the family Muricidae, the murex snails or rock snails.

Description

Distribution
This marine species occurs off Queensland, Ausyralia

References

 Houart, R., 2004. Two new species of Murexsul (Gastropoda: Muricidae) from Australia. . Molluscan Research 24: 115–122

Muricidae
Gastropods described in 2004